The Life of the Party is a 1930 American Pre-Code musical comedy filmed entirely in Technicolor. The musical numbers of this film were cut out before general release in the United States because the public had grown tired of musicals by late 1930. Only one song was left in the picture. The complete film was released intact in countries outside the United States where a backlash against musicals never occurred.

Plot
Flo and Dot work in a Broadway music shop. Flo sings while Dot plays the piano. Their boss complains to them that they are not selling as much sheet music as they should, and asks them to change their technique. Flo sings a song for a customer, after which, one of Dot's admirers, Monsieur LeMaire (Charles Judels), an eccentric Frenchman who owns a modiste shop, enters the shop. He begins annoying the boss by chatting with Dot and asking her out. When the boss tells him to come back after they finish working, LeMaire flies into a rage and throws sheet music all over the store. The boss immediately fires Dot and Flo. The scene moves to the apartment where the two women live. Dot is reading the newspaper and finds out her boyfriend has eloped with a rich elderly widow. She is so angry that she accepts Flo's idea that they become gold-diggers. Flo suggests that their first victim be LeMaire and the next day they begin to work for him. LeMaire soon asks Dot and Flo to a private party. Flo tells him they would love to attend but they have no suitable clothes. LeMaire tells them that they can borrow clothes from his modiste shop. Dot and Flo agree to attend the party and then pack off all the clothes they can carry with them. They head off to the train station with their luggage of expensive clothes and decide to go to Havana to make some real money.

Once Flo and Dot arrive in Havana they find that a millionaire, "A.J. Smith", who invented a famous soft drink, is staying at the hotel. They assume that a mean spirited and snobby acting man is the millionaire but the true millionaire is a young, pleasant and down-to-earth man. Dot  falls in love with Smith, much to Flo's chagrin. Smith, unbeknownst to Flo and Dot, is actually a gigolo looking for a rich woman to pay his meal ticket. Just as Dot is to marry the gigolo, LeMaire arrives and exposes the two gold-diggers. Smith, who has fallen in love with Dot, writes a check to LeMaire to cover the amount he lost, and he ends up winning Dot as his future wife.

A subplot involves Flo and Colonel Joy (Charles Butterworth), who raises horses. Colonel Joy is attracted to Flo and can't stop talking to her, although she does her best to avoid him. After some time, Flo is convinced by the colonel that his horse can't lose in the upcoming horse-race. She takes a chance and bets all her money, only to lose everything. Eventually they grow fond of each other and Colonel Joy proposes to Flo at the end of the film.

Cast

 Winnie Lightner as Flo
 Irene Delroy as Dorothy "Dot" Stottsbury
 Jack Whiting as the real Jerry "A.J." Smith
 Charles Butterworth as Colonel Joy
 Charles Judels as Monsieur LeMaire
 John Davidson as the fake Jerry "A.J." Smith
 Arthur Hoyt as Jerry's secretary

Songs
 "Poison Ivy"
 "Can It Be Possible?"(Cut from United States release print)
 "One Robin Doesn't Make A Spring" (Cut from United States release print)
 "Somehow" (Cut from United States release print)

Production
The music heard of the credits at the beginning of the film was added in the 1950s. These credits are also not original but have been redrawn, removing all indication that the film was photographed in Technicolor. The original music survives on Vitaphone disks. The rest of the film, beginning with the first title card ("New York was originally purchased from the Indians..."), has the original sound.

Box office
According to Warner Bros records the film earned $685,000 domestically and $212,000 foreign.

Preservation
The film survives only in a black and white copy (of the United States release print) made in the 1958 from Associated Artists Productions. Only a black and white copy of the cut print released in the United States (without most of the musical numbers) seems to have survived. The complete film was released intact in countries outside the United States where a backlash against musicals never occurred. It is unknown whether a copy of this full version still exists.

See also
 List of early color feature films

References

External links
 
 
 
 

1930s color films
Lost American films
Warner Bros. films
1930s English-language films
Films directed by Roy Del Ruth
Films set in New York City
American musical comedy films
1930 musical comedy films
1930 romantic comedy films
American romantic comedy films
Early color films
1930 lost films
1930s American films